is a town located in Kanzaki District, Hyōgo Prefecture, Japan. , the town had an estimated population of 11,275 in 4917 households and a population density of 53 persons per km².

Geography 
Ichikawa is located in the center of Hyōgo Prefecture, with the Ichikawa River flowing through the center of town. Mt. Kasagata (elevation 939m), which rises in the northeastern part of the town, is also called "Harima Fuji" for its silhouette.

Neighbouring municipalities 
Hyōgo Prefecture
 Himeji
 Kasai
 Fukusaki
 Kamikawa
 Taka

Climate
Ichikawa has a Humid subtropical climate (Köppen Cfa) characterized by warm summers and cool winters with light snowfall.  The average annual temperature in Ichikawa is 13.9 °C. The average annual rainfall is 1606 mm with September as the wettest month. The temperatures are highest on average in August, at around 25.6 °C, and lowest in January, at around 2.6 °C.

Demographics
Per Japanese census data, the population of Ichikawa has declined steadily over the last 30 years.

History
The area of the modern town of Ichikawa was within ancient Harima Province. In the Edo Period, it was divided between Himeji Domain and tenryō territory under direct administration of the Tokugawa shogunate. Following the Meiji restoration, the villages of Amaji, Kawanabe, Seka and Tsurui were created within Kanzaki District, Hyōgo. The four villages merged on March 31, 1955 forming the town of Ichikawa.

Government
Ichikawa has a mayor-council form of government with a directly elected mayor and a unicameral town council of 12 members. Ichikawa, together with the other municipalities of Kanzaki District, contributes one member to the Hyogo Prefectural Assembly. In terms of national politics, the town is part of Hyōgo 12th district of the lower house of the Diet of Japan.

Economy
The manufacturing of golf clubs in Japan began in Ichikawa in 1945. Currently there are about 20 different companies in Ichikawa contributing to the Japanese golf equipment industry. Products from the town are exported overseas. There is also a large golf course in the center of the town, called Forest Ichikawa Golf Club.

In addition to golf equipment manufacturing, Ichikawa is home to Tazumi no Tamago, or Tazumi's Eggs, a chicken farm that produces organic eggs. The eggs are sold in various restaurants and markets in Ichikawa.

Education
Ichikawa  has four public elementary schools and one public middle school operated by the Ichikawa Board of Education. There is one public high school operated by the Hyōgo Prefectural Department of Education.

 Ichikawa High School
 Ichikawa Junior High School
 Amaji Elementary School
 Kawanabe Elementary School
 Tsurui Elementary School
 Seka Elementary School

Transportation

Railway
 JR West – Bantan Line
   -

Highway
  Bantan Renraku Road

Sister city relations 
 - Port Townsend, Washington in the United States, from October 24, 2002

References

External links

Ichikawa official website 

Towns in Hyōgo Prefecture
Ichikawa, Hyōgo